35th New York Film Critics Circle Awards
January 25, 1970(announced December 29, 1969)

Best Picture: 
 Z 
The 35th New York Film Critics Circle Awards, honored the best filmmaking of 1969.

Winners
Best Actor:
Jon Voight - Midnight Cowboy
Runners-up: Dustin Hoffman - Midnight Cowboy and Robert Redford - Downhill Racer
Best Actress:
Jane Fonda - They Shoot Horses, Don't They?
Runners-up: Vanessa Redgrave - Isadora and Maggie Smith - The Prime of Miss Jean Brodie
Best Director:
Costa-Gavras - Z
Runners-up: Richard Attenborough - Oh! What a Lovely War and Luchino Visconti - The Damned (La caduta degli dei)
Best Film:
Z
Runners-up: Oh! What a Lovely War and The Damned (La caduta degli dei)
Best Screenplay:
Paul Mazursky and Larry Tucker - Bob & Carol & Ted & Alice
Runners-up: François Truffaut, Claude de Givray and Bernard Revon - Stolen Kisses (Baisers volés) and Luchino Visconti, Enrico Medioli and Nicola Badalucco - The Damned (La caduta degli dei)
Best Supporting Actor:
Jack Nicholson - Easy Rider
Runner-up: Elliott Gould - Bob & Carol & Ted & Alice
Best Supporting Actress:
Dyan Cannon - Bob & Carol & Ted & Alice
Runners-up: Catherine Burns - Last Summer and Delphine Seyrig - Stolen Kisses (Baisers volés)

References

External links
1969 Awards

1969
New York Film Critics Circle Awards, 1969
New York Film Critics Circle Awards
New York Film Critics Circle Awards
New York Film Critics Circle Awards
New York Film Critics Circle Awards